This is a list of awards and nominations received by American actor and producer Mark Wahlberg.

Major associations

Academy Awards

Golden Globe Awards

News and Documentary Emmy Awards

Primetime Emmy Awards

Screen Actors Guild Awards

British Academy Television Awards

Popular awards

Critics' Choice Movie Awards

MTV Movie & TV Awards

People's Choice Awards

Teen Choice Awards

Other awards and nominations

African-American Film Critics Association

Blockbuster Entertainment Awards

Boston Society of Film Critics

Florida Film Critics Circle

Golden Raspberry Awards

National Board of Review

National Society of Film Critics

Online Film Critics Society

San Diego Film Critics Society

Satellite Awards

Toronto Film Critics Association

Washington D.C. Area Film Critics Association

References

External links
 

Awards and nominations
Wahlberg, Mark